The Monster and the Ape was the 26th serial released by Columbia Pictures and was released in 1945.

Plot
The Monster of the title is the "Metalogen Man", a robot created by Professor Franklin Arnold.  After displaying his invention, the robot is stolen by Professor Ernst with the aid of his trained ape, Thor.  Ken Morgan leads the attempts to recover the stolen robot.

Cast
 Robert Lowery as Ken Morgan
 George Macready as Prof. Ernst
 Ralph Morgan as Prof. Arnold
 Carole Mathews as Babs Arnold
 Willie Best as Flash, Arnold's assistant
 Jack Ingram as Dick Nordik, henchmen
 Anthony Warde as Joe Flint, henchmen
 Ted Mapes as Joe Butler, henchmen
 Eddie Parker as Blake
 Stanley Price as Mead, henchmen
 Bud Osborne as Zoo's Night Watchman
 Ray Corrigan as Thor, trained ape

Critical reception
The Monster and the Ape was, in the opinion of Cline, "strikingly similar to Republic's serial Mysterious Doctor Satan."  However, he describes Professor Ernst as one of "the  serial form's...choicest villains."

Chapter titles
 The Mechanical Terror
 The Edge of Doom
 Flames of Fate
 The Fatal Search
 Rocks of Doom
 A Friend in Disguise
 A Scream in the Night
 Death in the Dark
 The Secret Tunnel
 Forty Thousand Volts
 The Mad Professor
 Shadows of Destiny
 The Gorilla at Large
 His Last Flight
 Justice Triumphs
Source:

References

External links

Cinefania.com

1945 films
1940s English-language films
American black-and-white films
American monster movies
1940s science fiction films
Columbia Pictures film serials
Films about apes
American science fiction films
1940s American films